Xanthopappus is a genus of Chinese plants in the tribe Cardueae within the family Asteraceae.

Species
The only known species is  Xanthopappus subacaulis, native to the Provinces of Gansu, Inner Mongolia, Ningxia, Qinghai, Sichuan, and Yunnan.

References

Endemic flora of China
Cynareae
Monotypic Asteraceae genera